The Naked Truth, by the actor Leslie Nielsen and writer David Fisher, is a fictional autobiography allegedly telling the inside story of Nielsen's life and acting career.  The book is written in the style of Nielsen's The Naked Gun series of films, with absurd statements describing him as one of the most important actors in the history of Hollywood.  Released in 1993 by Pocket Books (a division of Simon & Schuster, Inc.), the book was a tie-in for the then forthcoming third installment of the Naked Gun series, Naked Gun : The Final Insult.  

The copyright page notes that "This book is a work of fiction".  This is evidenced by numerous photographs featuring Nielsen superimposed on an unrelated scene, including having drinks at a bar with Howdy Doody or teaching the actor James Dean how to act.

The book is now out of print. 

Tagline: At Last!  The Hero of The Naked Gun Tells His Incredible Life Story -- Uncensored, Uninhibited, and Totally Made Up!

External links

 

1993 American novels
Absurdist fiction
American comedy novels